Roland Maywald  (born 1948) is a former German badminton player who won numerous (West) German national and other European titles from the late 1960s to the mid-1980s.

Career 
Though he won the German national singles title in 1974, Maywald was primarily a doubles specialist. He was particularly successful internationally in men's doubles with Willi Braun, whose fast forecourt racket complemented Maywald's steady all-court play. Braun and Maywald won the biennial European Championships consecutively in 1972 and 1974. They were thrice semifinalists at the prestigious All-England Championships (1971,1975 and 1976) and won the U.S. Open men's doubles in 1976. He also won two bronze medals at the 1972 Munich Olympic Games when badminton was played as a demonstration sport. Maywald also shared a number of mixed doubles titles in Europe with various partners. In 1975 he reached the final of mixed doubles at the All-England with Brigitte Steden.

References

External links 

German male badminton players
1948 births
Living people
People from Emmerich am Rhein
Badminton players at the 1972 Summer Olympics
Sportspeople from Düsseldorf (region)